Statistics of UAE Football League for the 2006–07 season.

Overview
It was contested by 12 teams, and Al Wasl FC won the championship.

League standings

Top goalscorers
Source: goalzz.com

19 goals
 Anderson Barbosa (Al Wasl)

17 goals
 Gregory du Frencie (Dubai Club)
 Ali Samereh (Al-Shaab)

15 goals
 Saeed Al Kass (Sharjah)

14 goals
 Nenad Jestrović (Al-Nasr)

13 goals
 Reza Enayati (Emirates Club)

12 goals
 Rasoul Khatibi (Sharja, Emirates Club)

11 goals
 Javad Kazemian (Al-Shaab)
 Faisal Khalil (Al-Ahli)

10 goals
 Prince Tagoe (Al-Shabab)

References
United Arab Emirates - List of final tables (RSSSF)

UAE Pro League seasons
United
1